Maurice Lalonde is the name of:

 Maurice Lalonde (politician) (1901-1956), member of Canadian Parliament
 Maurice Lalonde (Highlander character), a fictional person